Alida Maria Laura, Freiin Altenburger von Marckenstein-Frauenberg (31 May 1921 – 22 April 2006), better known by her stage name Alida Valli (or simply Valli), was an Italian actress who appeared in more than 100 films in a 70-year career, spanning from the 1930s to the early 2000s. She was one of the biggest stars of Italian film during the Fascist era, once being coined "the most beautiful woman in the world" by Benito Mussolini, but managed to find continued international success post-World War II. According to Frédéric Mitterrand, Valli was the only actress in Europe to equal Marlene Dietrich or Greta Garbo.

Valli worked with many significant directors both in Italy and abroad, including Alfred Hitchcock (The Paradine Case; 1947), Carol Reed (The Third Man; 1949), Luchino Visconti (Senso; 1954), Michelangelo Antonioni (Il Grido; 1957), Georges Franju (Eyes Without a Face; 1960), Pier Paolo Pasolini (Oedipus Rex; 1967), Mario Bava (Lisa and the Devil; 1972), Bernardo Bertolucci (1900, 1976; La Luna; 1979), and Dario Argento (Suspiria; 1977). Within her lifetime, Valli was invested a Knight of the Italian Republic, and received the Lifetime Achievement Golden Lion at the 1997 Venice Film Festival for her contributions to cinema.

Early life

Valli was born in Pola, Istria, Italy (today Pula, Croatia; until 1918 it had formed part of Austria-Hungary). She was of Austrian, Slovenian and Italian descent, although "she was never considered to be anything other than Italian." Her paternal grandfather was the Baron Luigi Altenburger (also: Altempurger), an Austrian-Italian from Trento, a descendant of the Counts d'Arco; her paternal grandmother was Elisa Tomasi from Trento, a cousin of the Roman senator Ettore Tolomei. Valli's mother, Silvia Oberecker Della Martina, born in Pola, was a "culturally sophisticated" housewife of half Slovene and half Italian descent. Valli's mother was the daughter of Felix Oberecker (also: Obrekar) from Laibach, Austria (now Ljubljana, Slovenia) and Virginia Della Martina from Pola, Istria (then part of Austria). Valli's maternal granduncle, Rodolfo, was a close friend of Gabriele D'Annunzio. Valli was multi-lingual. She grew up speaking Slovene, Italian, and German and was fluent as well in Serbo-Croatian, French, and English. In European films with international casts she would routinely film her dialogue in the language of the actors opposite her and dub herself (usually in Italian) for the soundtrack.

Valli was christened Freiin Altenburger von Marckenstein-Frauenberg. During her lifetime she also gained the titles Dr.h.c. of the III. University of Rome, Chevalier des Arts et des Lettres of France and Knight of the Italian Republic.

Career

Intellectually gifted, at fifteen Valli travelled to Rome, where she attended the Centro Sperimentale di Cinematografia, the oldest school for film actors and directors in Western Europe and still one of the most prestigious. At that time, she lived with her uncle Ettore Tolomei. Valli started her movie career in 1934, in Il cappello a tre punte (The Three Cornered Hat) during the so-called Telefoni Bianchi cinema era. Her first big success came with the movie Mille lire al mese (1939). After many roles in a large number of comedies, she earned her success as a dramatic actress in Piccolo mondo antico (1941), directed by Mario Soldati, for which she won a special Best Actress award at the Venice Film Festival.  During the Second World War, she starred in many movies, including Stasera niente di nuovo (1942) (whose song "Ma l'amore no" became the leitmotif of the Italian forties) and the diptych Noi Vivi / Addio Kira! (1943) (based on Ayn Rand's novel We the Living). These latter two movies were nearly censored by the Italian government under Benito Mussolini, but they were finally permitted because the novel upon which they were based was anti-Soviet. The films were successful, and the public easily realized that they were as much against fascism as communism. After several weeks, however, the films were pulled from theaters as the German and Italian governments, which abhorred communism, found out the story also carried an anti-fascist message.

By her early 20s, already widely regarded as the "most beautiful woman in the World", Valli had a career in English-language films through David Selznick, who signed her to a contract, thinking that he had found a second Ingrid Bergman. In Hollywood, she performed in great successes and memorable movies, in Alfred Hitchcock's The Paradine Case (1947) with Gregory Peck; with Fred MacMurray and Frank Sinatra (in his first non-musical performance), in The Miracle of the Bells (1948); alongside Orson Welles and Joseph Cotten in Carol Reed's The Third Man (1949), regarded as one of the best movies ever made worldwide and the British Film Institute selection as the greatest British film of all time; and again with Cotten in Walk Softly, Stranger (1950). Through these and other movies she gained international renown, often credited with the cursive word Valli, which would become her characteristic 'wordmark' in America "to make her sound even more exotic." In 1951, she complained that she disliked the single-name reference. "I feel silly going around with only one name," she said. "People get me mixed up with Rudy Vallée." The actress could not tolerate the strict rules of Selznick, who imposed total control on his actors, and managed to gain her contract's rescission, though with the payment of a high penalty.

She returned to Europe in the early 1950s and starred in many French and Italian films. In 1954, she had great success in the melodrama Senso, directed by Luchino Visconti. In that film, set in mid-19th-century Venice during the Risorgimento, she played a Venetian countess torn between patriotic ideals and an adulterous love for an officer (played by Farley Granger) of the occupying Austrian forces.

In 1956, Valli decided to stop making movies, concentrating instead on the stage. She was in charge of a company that produced Broadway plays in Italy.

She appeared in Georges Franju's horror film Eyes Without a Face (Les Yeux sans visage, 1959) (Eyes Without a Face, 1959) with Pierre Brasseur. From the 1960s, she worked in several pictures with prominent directors, such as Pier Paolo Pasolini's Edipo re (Oedipus Rex), 1967; Bernardo Bertolucci's La strategia del ragno, 1972; Novecento, 1976, and Dario Argento's Suspiria, 1977. Her final movie role was in Semana Santa (2002), with Mira Sorvino. In Italy, she was also well known for her stage appearances in such plays as Ibsen's Rosmersholm; Pirandello's Henry IV; John Osborne's Epitaph for George Dillon; and Arthur Miller's A View from the Bridge. At the 54th Venice International Film Festival in 1997 Alida Valli obtained the Golden Lion award for her career.

Personal life

Her teenage love, Carlo Cugnasca, was a famous Italian aerobatic pilot. He served as a fighter pilot with the Regia Aeronautica and was killed during a mission over British-held Tobruk on 14 April 1941.

Valli married Oscar de Mejo in 1943 and filed for divorce from him in 1949, but they reconciled. They had two sons together before their marriage ended in divorce in 1952 and she returned to Italy. She married Italian film director Giancarlo Zagni in the early 1960s, divorcing in 1970.

Valli's movie career suffered in 1953 from a scandal surrounding the death of Wilma Montesi, whose body was found on a public beach near Ostia. Prolonged investigations resulted, involving allegations of drug and sex orgies in Roman society. Among the accused – all of whom were acquitted, leaving the case unsolved – was Valli's lover, jazz musician Piero Piccioni (son of the Italian Minister of Foreign Affairs).

Death
Valli's death at her home on 22 April 2006 was announced by the office of the mayor of Rome, Walter Veltroni.

The critic David Shipman wrote in his book The Great Movie Stars: The International Years, that on the basis of her best-known films before 1950, she might seem to be "one of Hollywood's least successful continental imports", but a viewer of "any two or three of the films she has made since then ... will probably regard her as one of the half-dozen best actresses in the world". The French critic Frédéric Mitterrand wrote: "[She] was the only actress in Europe to equal Marlene Dietrich or Greta Garbo".

Filmography

Film

Television
I Figli di Medea (1959) as Medea / Alida Valli
Il caso Mauritius (1961)
 Combat! as Marie (Episode: "Doughboy", 1963)
Desencuentro (series, 1964)
Rome Will Never Leave You, three episodes of Dr. Kildare (1964) as Luisa Brabante
Il consigliere imperiale (1974)
Les grandes conjurations: Le tumulte d'Amboise (1978)
L'altro Simenon (series, 1979)
L'eredità della priora (serial, 1980) as Priora
Dramma d'amore (serial, 1983)
Piccolo mondo antico (serial, 1989) as La marchesa Maironi
Una vita in gioco 2 (serial, 1992)
Delitti privati (1992) as Matilde Pierboni

Theatre
La casa dei Rosmer (1956) Henrik Ibsen (aka Rosmersholm)
L'uomo, la bestia e la virtù  (1956),  Luigi Pirandello
Gli innocenti  (1956), William Archibald
Enrico IV  (1958), Luigi Pirandello
Il sole e la luna  (1965), Guglielmo Biraghi
Epitaffo per George Dillon  (1966), John Osborne and Anthony Creighton (Epitaph for George Dillon)
Uno sguardo dal ponte  (1967), Arthur Miller (A View from the Bridge)
La bambolona   (1968),  Raf Vallone
Il dio Kurt  (1969),  Alberto Moravia
I parenti terribili  (1969),  Jean Cocteau (Les parents terribles)
LSD-Lei, scusi, divorzierebbe?  (1970),  Carlo Maria Pensa
Uno sporco egoista  (1971), Francois Dorin
Lulu (Lo spirito della terra – Il vaso di Pandora)  (1972), Frank Wedekind (Lulu [Erdgeist-Die Büchse der Pandora])
Le massacre à Paris  (1972), Christopher Marlowe (The Massacre at Paris)
Il Gabbiano  (1973), Anton Cechov
L'uomo che incontrò de stesso  (1981), Luigi Antonelli
La Venexiana  (1981),   Anonimo del Cinquecento
La fiaccola sotto il moggio (1981), Gabriele d'Annunzio
Ekaterina Ivanovna  (1983),  Leonid Andreev
Il malinteso  (1984),  Albert Camus (Le malentendu)
Romeo e Giulietta  (1985), William Shakespeare (Romeo and Juliet)
A porte chiuse, da Sartre a Mishima  (1986),  di Jean-Paul Sartre e Yukio Mishima (Huis clos – Aoi – Hanjo)
La città morta  (1988),  Gabriele D'Annunzio
La nave  (1988), Gabriele D'Annunzio
I paraventi   (1990),  Jean Genet (Les paravents)
Improvvisamente l'estate scorsa   (1991),   Tennessee Williams (Suddenly Last Summer)
Più grandiose dimore   (1993),  Eugene O'Neill
Così è (se vi pare)   (1994),  Luigi Pirandello
Questa sera si recita a soggetto   (1995),  Luigi Pirandello

Radio appearances

Lux Radio Theatre broadcast "The Paradine Case" in a radio adaptation of the film on 9 May 1949, starring Joseph Cotten, with Alida Valli and Louis Jourdan reprising their roles.

References

External links

 Alida Valli webpage
 film noir
Istria on the Internet, Prominent Istrians
 
 
 Alida Valli at Reel Classics
  Obituary in The Telegraph.  April 24, 2006.
 Obituary in New York Times. April 25, 2006.
 
 
 Photographs of Alida Valli
 

1921 births
2006 deaths
Austrian baronesses
Burials at Campo Verano
Centro Sperimentale di Cinematografia alumni
David di Donatello Career Award winners
David di Donatello winners
Istrian Italian people
Italian film actresses
Italian stage actresses
Italian people of Austrian descent
Italian people of German descent
Italian television actresses
Italian people of Slovene descent
Nastro d'Argento winners
People from Pula